The China Open is an annual bonspiel, or curling tournament, held in Tianjin, China, however, in 2018, the event was held in Chongqing. The original event was held in 2013. The tournament is held in a round robin format. Over the three years that the tournament has been held, there has been teams from 14 different countries that have participated: Canada, China, Denmark, Germany, Japan, South Korea, Netherlands, New Zealand, Norway, Russia, Scotland, Sweden, Switzerland and United States.

Past Champions

Men

Women

References

World Curling Tour events
Curling competitions in China
Women's World Curling Tour events
Sports competitions in Tianjin